Rasenoides is a flat sided, evolute, radially ribbed Lower Jurassic ammonite belonging to the ammonitida.

Distribution 
Russian and Switzerland

References
Notes

Jurassic ammonites